H7 (in former name Csepeli HÉV) is a rapid transit line in Budapest, Hungary. It connects the city centre Grand Boulevard (Boráros Square) and Csepel (former suburb, now part of Greater Budapest). The line was built in 1951.

History

Gallery

References

Transport in Budapest
Rapid transit in Hungary
Regional rail in Hungary